Sundown Jim is a 1942 American Western film directed by James Tinling, written by William Bruckner and Robert F. Metzler, and starring John Kimbrough, Virginia Gilmore, Arleen Whelan, Joe Sawyer, Paul Hurst and Moroni Olsen. It was released on March 27, 1942, by 20th Century Fox.

Kimbrough was a star player for the undefeated 1939 Texas A&M Aggies football team who made two Western movies, then returned to Texas to become a member of the state legislature.

Plot

Into the town of Resurrection rides a lawman, "Sundown" Jim Majors, who finds himself in the middle of a feud. A rancher's daughter, Tony Black, is angry because her father was shot by hired guns working for rival rancher Andrew Barr, including outlaw Ben Moffitt.

Jim intervenes, retrieving U.S. mail stolen by the gang and meeting Barr's daughter Catherine, who knows that her father hired gunmen after causing anger with recent land transactions. Moffitt eventually double-crosses Barr, killing him, before Jim defeats him and his gang with Tony's help. Offered to stay as the town's new marshal, Jim accepts and begins planning a wedding with Catherine.

Cast   
John Kimbrough as Sundown Jim Majors
Virginia Gilmore as Tony Black
Arleen Whelan as Catherine Barr
Joe Sawyer as Ben Moffitt 
Paul Hurst as Broderick
Moroni Olsen as Andrew Barr
Don Costello as Dobe Hyde
LeRoy Mason as Henchman Brick
Lane Chandler as Nat Oldroyd
James Bush as Ring Barr
Charles Tannen as Dan Barr
Cliff Edwards as Stable proprietor
Paul Sutton as Henchman Dale
Eddy Waller as Clem Black
Tom Fadden as Stagecoach driver
Frank McGrath as Outlaw

References

External links 
 

1942 films
20th Century Fox films
American Western (genre) films
1942 Western (genre) films
Films directed by James Tinling
1940s English-language films
1940s American films